The Men's keirin was one of the 10 men's events held at the 2007 UCI Track World Championship, held in Palma de Mallorca, Spain.

29 cyclists from 18 countries participated in the contest. After the 4 qualifying heats, the fastest 2 riders in each heat advance to the second round. The remaining ones face a first round repechage.

The riders that did not advance to the second round race in 4 repechage heats. The first rider in each heat advance to the second round along with the 8 that qualified before.

The first 3 riders from each of the 2 Second Round heats advance to the Final and the remaining will race a consolation 7–12 final.

The whole event took place on March 30. The First Round and Repechage on the morning session and the Second Round and Finals on the evening session. The Final started at 20:40.

First round

Heat 1

Heat 2

Heat 3

Heat 4

First Round Repechage

Heat 1

Heat 2

Heat 3

Heat 4

Second round

Heat 1

Heat 2

Finals

Final 1-6

Final 7-12

References

Men's keirin
UCI Track Cycling World Championships – Men's keirin